Jonathan Björklund (born May 1, 1994) is a Swedish ice hockey player. He is currently playing with Brynäs IF of the Swedish Hockey League (SHL).

Björklund made his Swedish Hockey League debut playing with Brynäs IF during the 2013–14 SHL season.

References

External links

1994 births
Brynäs IF players
Living people
Swedish ice hockey left wingers